Kim Su-jung (born April 9, 2004) is a South Korean actress of Russian descent. Kim began her career as a child actress, and has starred in television series and films, such as Two Wives (2009), Pink Lipstick (2011) and Champ (2011). She is also known as host for one of segments in Star Golden Bell.

Filmography

Film

Television series

Variety show

Awards and nominations

References

External links 
 
 
 
 

2004 births
Living people
South Korean child actresses
South Korean television actresses
South Korean film actresses
South Korean people of Russian descent
School of Performing Arts Seoul alumni